Broadwell Township is located in Logan County, Illinois. At the 2010 census, its population was 3,549 and it contained 256 housing units.  Most of the residents of the township are inmates at the Lincoln and Logan Correctional Centers.

Geography

Demographics

References

External links
US Census
City-data.com
Illinois State Archives

Townships in Logan County, Illinois
Populated places established in 1865
Townships in Illinois